Ramakrishna Ramesh Menon (born 20 September 1951) is an Indian author of several literary renderings in modern English prose of classical works from the ancient Hindu tradition.

His books include The Ramayana: A Modern Retelling of the Great Indian Epic (Farrar, Straus & Giroux and HarperCollins India); The Mahabharata: A Modern Rendering (2 volumes), Krishna: Life and Song of the Blue God, Siva: The Siva Purana Retold, Devi: The Devi Bhagavatam Retold, the Bhagavata Purana (2 volumes), a new translation of the Bhagavad-Gita, and a 12 volume retelling of The Complete Mahabharata (as writer and series editor) - all Rupa Publications.

All his main books, apart from the latest Complete Mahabharata series (finished in September 2017), have gone into many reprints in India.

Biography
Born in New Delhi, Menon studied at St Xavier's High School and St Stephen's College, where he read History Honours (1968–69) and then Philosophy Honours (1969–70), but left college without taking a degree. Reading the Bhagavad-Gita at this time was a life-changing experience for him. It was the seed from which all his later work emerged.

He developed an informal guru-sishya relationship with the great Malayalam novelist OV Vijayan, and translated two of his master's novels into English: The Infinity of Grace (Penguin) and Madhuram Gayathi (yet to be published by Vijayan's estate after his demise in 2005).

Menon has lived and worked in Delhi, Hong Kong, Bengaluru, Jakarta, Tiruvananthapuram, Kodaikanal and Chennai.

Critical response
In a starred review, Kirkus Reviews described his Ramayana as 'A masterpiece made new for a generation of readers who ought to be very grateful indeed to Menon'.

British theatre director Peter Brook called the book 'A beautiful new rendering of an inexhaustible theme'.

His 2 volume rendering of the Mahabharata is his most read and reviewed book.

References

1951 births
Living people
Writers from Delhi